Dendronotus kamchaticus is a species of sea slug, a dendronotid nudibranch, a shell-less marine gastropod mollusc in the family Dendronotidae.

Etymology
This species is named after Kamchatka, where it was found.

Distribution 
This species was described from specimens collected at 7 m depth at Cape Baraniy, Avachinskiy Bay, Kamchatka, northwest Pacific Ocean.

Description
Dendronotus kamchaticus has a patterned body which is similar to Dendronotus frondosus, Dendronotus kalikal and Dendronotus venustus. It is distinguished from these species by details of the colour pattern, the branching of the dorsal appendages (cerata), the smooth median tooth of the radula in adults and molecular characters.

References

Dendronotidae
Gastropods described in 2015